General İsmail Metin Temel (12 March 1958, Adana) is a Turkish Second Army Command former commander. He was the commander of Turkish forces in Syria from 2016 to 2018.

Biography
İsmail Metin Temel was born in 1958 in Adana. His family settled in Adana in the 1970s. He joined the Turkish Army in 1981. In 2012, Temel was appointed Commander of the 3rd Tactical Infantry Division/Yuksekova Hakkari. In 2016, General Temel, by now Commander of the Van Gendarmerie Public Security Corps, was appointed Commander of the Second Army.

Military career 
Temel has commanded two campaigns. The first was Operation Euphrates Shield, in which he and Lt. Gen. Zekai Aksakallı began the [[Turkish occupation of northern Syria. His second campaign, the Turkish military operation in Afrin, came amid growing tensions between the Turkish and American governments over the latter's support of the Syrian Democratic Forces (SDF). The SDF includes the People's Protection Units (YPG), which the Turkish government describes as a branch of the Kurdistan Workers' Party (PKK). In particular, the Turkish state objected to announced plans by the US to train and equip a 30,000-strong Syrian Border Security Force, which it claimed posed a direct threat to their security. On 31 December 2018, Temel was appointed to the General Staff's Directorate of Audit and Evaluation, by presidential decree.

References

1958 births
Commanders of the Second Army of Turkey
People from Adana
Living people
Turkish Army generals